Dovre can refer to:

Places

Norway
 Dovre, a municipality in Innlandet county
 Dovre (village), a village in Dovre municipality in Innlandet county
 Dovre Church, a church in Dovre municipality in Innlandet county
 Dovre National Park, a national park in Innlandet county
 Dovrefjell, a mountain range in central Norway
 Dovrefjell–Sunndalsfjella National Park, a national park centered on the Dovrefjell mountain range in Central Norway
 Dovre Region, the area surrounding the Dovrefjell mountain range

United States
 Dovre, Wisconsin, a small town in the state of Wisconsin

Other
 Dovre Line, the main railway line running between Oslo and Trondheim in Norway
 I Dovregubbens hall, the Norwegian title of the musical piece In the Hall of the Mountain King, by Edvard Grieg